The 1991 Pittsburgh Panthers football team represented the University of Pittsburgh in the 1991 NCAA Division I-A football season. This was Pitt's first season as a football member of the Big East Conference. They had been an independent since the program's inception in 1890.

Schedule

Roster

Coaching staff

Team players drafted into the NFL

References

Pittsburgh
Pittsburgh Panthers football seasons
Pittsburgh Panthers football